Bordesholmer See is a lake in Schleswig-Holstein, Germany.

External links 
 

Lakes of Schleswig-Holstein
LBordesholmerSee